Dutton's Books was an independent bookstore located in Valley Village, Los Angeles in the San Fernando Valley. It was known for its friendly and knowledgeable staff, sizeable and affordable used book collection, rare books, and its owners Dave and Judy Dutton. There were two Dutton's locations in the San Fernando Valley, the other located in Burbank, California, but the Valley Village location was the larger of the two. 

Opened in 1960, on the corner of Laurel Canyon Boulevard and Magnolia Boulevard in a former liquor store, by Dave Dutton's parents, the store was eventually taken over by Dave and his wife Judy in the mid-1970s. It served as one of the San Fernando Valley's best independent bookstores. They offered services such as book buyback, book signings, and in-store reading events with community authors. Owners Dave and Judy were extremely knowledgeable and were happy to speak with customers regarding literature, Southern California history or any other topic. The store also provided many books for various movie and television sets. Steady customers, friendly staff, and welcoming owners made the store an ideal place to while away a Sunday afternoon. 

As with most independent bookstores, the impact of discount stores such as Walmart and Costco as well as competition from Amazon led to the closing of Dutton's in 2006. The Burbank location closed a year earlier. While there are still some independent bookstores located in the San Fernando Valley, the loss of Dutton's was a difficult blow to owners, customers, and employees alike.

Further reading

References

Retail companies established in 1960
Retail companies disestablished in 2006
1960 establishments in California
2006 disestablishments in California
Bookstores in California
Independent bookstores of the United States
Culture of Los Angeles
Companies based in Los Angeles
North Hollywood, Los Angeles
American companies established in 1960
Bookstores established in the 20th century
Defunct companies based in Greater Los Angeles